Godman's garter snake (Thamnophis godmani) is a species of snake in the family Colubridae. The species is endemic to southern Mexico, and was first described by Albert Günther in 1894.

Etymology
The specific name godmani is in honor of the British naturalist Frederick DuCane Godman.

Geographic range
T. godmani is found in the Mexican states of Guerrero, Oaxaca, Puebla, and Veracruz.

References

External links

Further reading
Boulenger GA (1896). Catalogue of the Snakes in the British Museum (Natural History). Volume III., Containing the Colubridæ (Opisthoglyphæ and Proteroglyphæ), Amblycephalidæ, and Viperidæ. London: Trustees of the British Museum (Natural History). (Taylor and Francis, printers). xiv + 727 pp. + Plates I-XXV. (Tropidonotus godmani, p. 600).
Günther ACLG (1894). Biologia Centrali-Americana. Reptilia and Batrachia. London : Godman and Salvin. (Taylor and Francis, printers). xx + 326 pp. + Plates 1-76. [Published in parts 1885-1902]. (Tropidonotus godmani, new species, p. 133).
Heimes, Peter (2016). Snakes of Mexico: Herpetofauna Mexicana Vol I. Frankfurt, Germany: Chimaira. 572 pp. .
Rossman, Douglas A.; Burbrink, Frank R. (2005). "Species limits within the Mexican garter snakes of the Thamnophis godmani complex". Occ. Pap. Mus. Nat. Sci., Louisiana State Univ. (79): 1-44.

Thamnophis
Reptiles described in 1894
Reptiles of Mexico
Taxa named by Albert Günther